Carmarthen (Welsh: Caerfyrddin) was the name of a parliamentary constituency in Wales which returned one Member of Parliament (MP)  to the House of Commons of the Parliament of the United Kingdom between 1542 and 1997. It was named Carmarthen Boroughs from 1832 to 1918.
At its abolition in 1997 it was replaced, partly by the new Carmarthen East and Dinefwr constituency and partly by Carmarthen West and South Pembrokeshire.

History 
Because the seat contained mining areas in the valley of the River Gwendraeth (until the 1980s), much countryside and a high proportion of Welsh speakers, it was fertile territory for the Labour Party, the Conservatives and Plaid Cymru alike. Although the Conservatives never won the seat, they came within 1200 votes of doing so in 1983.

Carmarthen is notable as the first constituency to elect a Plaid Cymru MP, Gwynfor Evans, at a 1966 by-election. Evans was later involved in one of the closest General Election results ever in February 1974, when he lost to the Labour candidate by only three votes. The constituency also shot to fame in the following election in October 1974 as the only seat in the country to see its turnout rise on that of February 1974.

Boundaries 
Until 1832, it was a borough constituency consisting of the town of Carmarthen. 
Between 1832 and 1918 it was a district of boroughs constituency, consisting of Carmarthen itself and Llanelli, and was sometimes called "The Carmarthen Boroughs".

In 1918, the borough was abolished, but the name was transferred to one of the divisions of the county of Carmarthenshire.
The constituency was made up of the whole of the county of Carmarthenshire except for the urban area around Llanelli. Notable towns were Carmarthen itself, Ammanford and Llandeilo.

In 1997, the Boundary Commission for Wales recommended an extra seat for Dyfed. This led to the seat being split two to one between Carmarthen East & Dinefwr and Carmarthen West & South Pembrokeshire.

Members of Parliament

MPs 1542–1640

1640–1832

1832–1918: Carmarthen Boroughs

1918–1997: county constituency

Elections

Elections in the 1830s 

At the 1830 general election, rioting broke out during polling, at which point John Jones and his Whig rival, John George Philipps, had secured three votes apiece. The vote was abandoned and a by-election was called four months later in December.

Elections in the 1840s

Elections in the 1850s

Elections in the 1860s
Morris' death caused a by-election.

Elections in the 1870s

Nevill resigned, causing a by-election.

Cowell-Stepney resigned, causing a by-election.

Elections in the 1880s 

Williams resigned after being appointed a County Court judge, causing a by-election.

Elections in the 1890s 

Lewis Morris was Liberal candidate but retired before the poll.

Elections in the 1900s

Elections in the 1910s

Elections in the 1920s

Elections in the 1930s

Elections in the 1940s
1941 Carmarthen by-election
Labour: Moelwyn Hughes elected unopposed.

Elections in the 1950s

Elections in the 1960s

Elections in the 1970s

Elections in the 1980s

Elections in the 1990s

Notes and references

Sources
 Robert Beatson, A Chronological Register of Both Houses of Parliament (London: Longman, Hurst, Res & Orme, 1807) 
 D Brunton & D H Pennington, Members of the Long Parliament (London: George Allen & Unwin, 1954)
 Cobbett's Parliamentary history of England, from the Norman Conquest in 1066 to the year 1803 (London: Thomas Hansard, 1808) 
 The Constitutional Year Book for 1913 (London: National Union of Conservative and Unionist Associations, 1913)
 F W S Craig, British Parliamentary Election Results 1832–1885 (2nd edition, Aldershot: Parliamentary Research Services, 1989)
 J Holladay Philbin, Parliamentary Representation 1832 – England and Wales (New Haven: Yale University Press, 1965)

Historic parliamentary constituencies in South Wales
Constituencies of the Parliament of the United Kingdom established in 1542
Constituencies of the Parliament of the United Kingdom disestablished in 1997
Politics of Carmarthenshire